Camarotoechia is an extinct genus of brachiopods found in Paleozoic strata.

Taxonomy 
Cherkesova (2007) reassigns two taxa, "radiata" and "omaliusi", that Nalivkin had placed in Camarotoechia, to Sinotectirostrum as a new combination for a species and a subspecies respectively. The type of Camarotoechia is perhaps Atrypa congretata Conrad, 1841. The species †Camarotoechia elegans is from the Ordovician and Silurian of the Siberian Platform. It includes one subspecies Camarotoechia elegans forma ramosa.

Species 
The following species of Camarotoechia have been described:
 C. bimesiornata
 C. dotis (Floresta Formation, Colombia)
 C. elegans (Siberia)
 C. haraganensis
 C. latisinuata
 C. tethys

References

Further reading 
 Etude nouvelle en deux parties, du genre Camarotoechia Hall and Clarke, 1893. Deuxième partie Cupularostrum recticostatum n. gen. n. sp. P Sartenaer, Bulletin de l'Institut royal des Sciences naturelles de Belgique, 1961
 An Introduction to the Study of the Brachiopoda: 13th Annual Report New York State Geologist for the year 1893, Pt. 2. J Hall, JM Clarke, Palaeontology. Albany, NY, 1894

External links 

 

Rhynchonellida
Prehistoric brachiopod genera
Paleozoic brachiopods of South America
Devonian Colombia
Fossils of Colombia
Floresta Formation
Paleozoic animals of North America
Fossils of Georgia (U.S. state)
Paleozoic life of Ontario
Paleozoic life of Alberta
Paleozoic life of British Columbia
Paleozoic life of Manitoba
Paleozoic life of New Brunswick
Paleozoic life of the Northwest Territories
Paleozoic life of Nova Scotia
Paleozoic life of Nunavut
Paleozoic life of Quebec
Paleozoic life of Yukon
Fossil taxa described in 1893